Chatham High School may refer to:

Chatham High School (Taree, New South Wales), Taree, New South Wales, Australia
 United States
Glenwood High School (Illinois)/. Chatham, Illinois — sometimes labeled "Chatham (Glenwood)" in sports, and successor to Chatham High School
Chatham High School (Massachusetts), Chatham, Massachusetts
Chatham High School (New Jersey), Chatham, New Jersey
Chatham High School (New York), Chatham, New York
Chatham High School (Virginia), Chatham, Virginia

See also
 Chatham Central High School, Bear Creek, North Carolina